Putney is the primary village and a census-designated place (CDP) in the town of Putney, Windham County, Vermont, United States. As of the 2020 census, it had a population of 571, compared to 2,617 in the entire town. The Putney Village Historic District occupies the center of the CDP.

The CDP is in eastern Windham County, on the southern edge of the town of Putney. It is bordered to the south by the town of Dummerston. U.S. Route 5 is the village's Main Street; it leads north  to Bellows Falls and south  to Brattleboro.

Sacketts Brook, a south-flowing tributary of the Connecticut River flows through the CDP.

References 

Populated places in Windham County, Vermont
Census-designated places in Windham County, Vermont
Census-designated places in Vermont